Minnehaha River is a stream in the U.S. state of Mississippi.

The name Minnehaha is a transfer from Minnehaha Falls, in Minnesota.

References

Rivers of Mississippi
Rivers of Pike County, Mississippi
Mississippi placenames of Native American origin